NA-77 Gujranwala-IV is a constituency for the National Assembly of Pakistan.

Members of Parliament

2018-2022: NA-81 Gujranwala-III

Election 2002 

General elections were held on 10 Oct 2002. Chaudhry Imran Ullah Advocate of PPP won by 28,024 votes.

Election 2008 

General elections were held on 18 Feb 2008. Usman Ibrahim of PML-N won by 51,705 votes.

Election 2013 

General elections were held on 11 May 2013. Usman Ibrahim of PML-N won by 108,457 votes and became the  member of National Assembly.

Election 2018 

General elections were held on 25 July 2018.

See also
NA-76 Gujranwala-III
NA-78 Gujranwala-V

References

External links
 Election result's official website

NA-095